Rashawn Jackson (born January 15, 1987) is a former American football fullback. He was drafted by the Oakland Raiders then, he was signed by the Carolina Panthers as a free agent in 2010. He played college football at Virginia.

Professional career

Carolina Panthers
After going undrafted in the 2010 NFL Draft, Jackson signed with the Carolina Panthers on April 30, 2010. He was released on September 4, 2010, and signed to the practice squad.  On December 23, 2010, he made his NFL debut against the Pittsburgh Steelers. He played in two games, starting one, for the Panthers in 2010.

He was waived on September 1, 2011.

Chicago Rush
Jackson was assigned to the Chicago Rush on November 14, 2011. He was exempted by the Rush on January 9, 2012.

Oakland Raiders
On January 9, 2012, signed to a future/reserve contract by the Oakland Raiders. He was placed on Injured Reserve on August 29, 2012 and later waived on September 5, 2012, after reaching an injury settlement. Jackson displayed game changing catching ability, sneaky quickness, and versatility to play multiple roles on his team.  His retirement marked the  unfortunate reality that the Fullback position was being phased out of the game.

References

External links
Carolina Panthers bio
Virginia Cavaliers bio

1987 births
Living people
Players of American football from New Jersey
American football running backs
Virginia Cavaliers football players
Carolina Panthers players
Chicago Rush players
Oakland Raiders players
St. Peter's Preparatory School alumni